Greenbushes is a timber and mining town located in the South West region of Western Australia. The 2021 population was 365.

History
Greenbushes was founded as a mining town in 1888 following a surveyor's discovery of tin in 1886. Greenbushes was named after the bright green Oxylobium lanceolatum that contrasted against the grey eucalyptus trees. The railway from Donnybrook to Bridgetown opened in 1898, with Greenbushes station located approximately six kilometres north of the main townsite. The area surrounding the railway station was renamed North Greenbushes to reduce confusion.

A separate town site of South Greenbushes, also known as Bunbury End began in 1896. The town had its own post office, hall and strong community until the 1930s when most moved to the main town site. The town boasted its own cricket team as well as many other groups.

The town experienced a period of economic boom until the international price of tin slumped in 1893, which caused the Greenbushes' industry to collapse. By 1913, approximately one quarter of Greenbushes' inhabitants were working in the timber industry, which was established shortly after the first mine.

Industry
Greenbushes' two major industries are mining, producing tantalite concentrates, lithium minerals, tin metal and kaolin; and timber milling. Agriculture, viticulture, tourism and art galleries are also part of Greenbushes' industry.

The Greenbushes mine, located to the south of the town, has produced lithium concentrate since 1985. , it's the largest lithium mine in the world.

References

External links
Shire of Bridgetown-Greenbushes website

 
Towns in Western Australia
Mining towns in Western Australia
South West (Western Australia)
Timber towns in Western Australia